Coti-Chiavari is a commune of the Corse-du-Sud department of France on the island of Corsica.

Population

Sights
Torra di Capu Neru
Torra di Capu di Muru
Torra di a Castagna

See also
Communes of the Corse-du-Sud department

References

Communes of Corse-du-Sud
Corse-du-Sud communes articles needing translation from French Wikipedia